Mike Siravo is an American football coach. He currently is the inside linebackers coach for the Minnesota Vikings of the NFL. He previously served as the defensive run game coordinator and linebackers coach for the Carolina Panthers.

Playing career

A walk-on at Boston College, Siravo earned a scholarship and lettered two years at linebacker under head coaches Dan Henning and Tom O'Brien for the Eagles. In his senior season, he earned Academic All-Big East honors.

Coaching career

Boston College
Siravo began his coaching career as a graduate assistant at Boston College from 1998 to 2000.

Colombia 
Between 2003 and 2005, Siravo was the linebackers coach at Columbia University.

Temple 
For the 2006 season, Siravo was the recruiting coordinator for the Owls.

Boston College (second time)
Siravo returned to his alma mater, and served as the Eagles’ defensive backs coach and recruiting coordinator between 2007 and 2012.

Temple (second time)
Between 2013 and 2015 Siravo was the linebackers coach for the Owls. In 2016 he was promoted and added the titles of defensive run coordinator and recruiting coordinator.

Baylor
Siravo followed Matt Rhule to Baylor in 2017. For the next two years he served as the team's Linebackers Coach and Recruiting Coordinator. In 2019 he traded in the title of recruiting coordinator for special teams coordinator.

Panthers
In 2020, Siravo followed Rhule and was hired by the Carolina Panthers as their linebackers coach.

Vikings 
Siravo was hired in February of 2023 by the Minnesota Vikings as their inside linebackers coach, shortly after the hiring of Brian Flores as Defensive Coordinator.

Personal life
Mike and his wife, Alison, are the parents of three children.

References 
Bio

American football linebackers
Baylor Bears football coaches
Boston College alumni
Boston College Eagles football coaches
Boston College Eagles football players
Carolina Panthers coaches
Columbia Lions football coaches
People from Pawtucket, Rhode Island
Players of American football from Rhode Island
Temple Owls football coaches
Living people

Year of birth missing (living people)